The first election to Lisburn and Castlereagh City Council, part of the Northern Ireland local elections on 22 May 2014, returned 40 members to the newly formed council via Single Transferable Vote. The Democratic Unionist Party won half of the seats.

Election results

Districts summary

|- class="unsortable" align="centre"
!rowspan=2 align="left"|Ward
! % 
!Cllrs
! %
!Cllrs
! %
!Cllrs
! %
!Cllrs
! %
!Cllrs
! %
!Cllrs
! %
!Cllrs
! %
!Cllrs
!rowspan=2|TotalCllrs
|- class="unsortable" align="center"
!colspan=2 bgcolor="" | DUP
!colspan=2 bgcolor="" | UUP
!colspan=2 bgcolor="" | Alliance
!colspan=2 bgcolor=""| SDLP
!colspan=2 bgcolor=""| NI21
!colspan=2 bgcolor="" | TUV
!colspan=2 bgcolor=""| Sinn Féin
!colspan=2 bgcolor="white"| Others
|-
|align="left"|Castlereagh East
|bgcolor="#D46A4C"|48.4
|bgcolor="#D46A4C"|3
|8.8
|1
|12.5
|1
|0.0
|0
|0.0
|0
|10.4
|1
|0.0
|0
|19.9
|0
|6
|-
|align="left"|Castlereagh South
|22.2
|2
|11.1
|1
|bgcolor="#F6CB2F"|23.3
|bgcolor="#F6CB2F"|2
|22.7
|2
|4.4
|0
|6.4
|0
|9.9
|0
|0.0
|0
|7
|-
|align="left"|Downshire East
|bgcolor="#D46A4C"|47.0
|bgcolor="#D46A4C"|3
|19.5
|1
|11.5
|1
|0.0
|0
|11.6
|0
|6.9
|0
|0.0
|0
|3.5
|0
|5
|-
|align="left"|Downshire West
|bgcolor="#D46A4C"|34.6
|bgcolor="#D46A4C"|2
|27.4
|2
|8.5
|1
|4.0
|0
|6.1
|0
|5.8
|0
|0.0
|0
|13.6
|0
|5
|-
|align="left"|Killultagh
|bgcolor="#D46A4C"|44.6
|bgcolor="#D46A4C"|3
|18.2
|1
|7.0
|0
|10.8
|1
|6.2
|0
|0.0
|0
|13.2
|0
|0.0
|0
|5
|-
|align="left"|Lisburn North
|bgcolor="#D46A4C"|37.5
|bgcolor="#D46A4C"|3
|16.0
|1
|10.7
|1
|7.0
|0
|8.6
|1
|4.5
|0
|7.5
|0
|8.2
|0
|6
|-
|align="left"|Lisburn South
|bgcolor="#D46A4C"|53.6
|bgcolor="#D46A4C"|4
|14.0
|1
|6.9
|1
|6.8
|0
|8.9
|0
|7.5
|0
|0.0
|0
|2.3
|0
|6
|- class="unsortable" class="sortbottom" style="background:#C9C9C9"
|align="left"| Total
|40.4
|20
|16.0
|8
|12.0
|7
|8.0
|3
|6.9
|1
|5.9
|1
|4.7
|0
|6.1
|0
|40
|-
|}

District results

Castlereagh East

2014: 3 x DUP, 1 x Alliance, 1 x TUV, 1 x UUP

Castlereagh South

2014: 2 x Alliance, 2 x SDLP, 2 x DUP, 1 x UUP

Downshire East

2014: 3 x DUP, 1 x UUP, 1 x Alliance

Downshire West

2014: 2 x DUP, 2 x UUP, 1 x Alliance

Killultagh

2014: 3 x DUP, 1 x UUP, 1 x SDLP

Lisburn North

2014: 3 x DUP, 1 x UUP, 1 x Alliance, 1 x NI21

Lisburn South

2014: 4 x DUP, 1 x UUP, 1 x Alliance

*Incumbent.

Changes during the term

† Co-options

‡ Changes in affiliation 

Last update 25 March 2019.

Current composition: see Lisburn and Castlereagh.

References

2014 Northern Ireland local elections
21st century in County Antrim
21st century in County Down
Elections in County Antrim
Elections in County Down